General elections were held in Lebanon between 5 April and 3 May 1964. Independent candidates won the majority of seats. Voter turnout was 53.0%.

Results

References

Lebanon
1964 in Lebanon
Elections in Lebanon
Election and referendum articles with incomplete results